Christopher Robert Hayward (June 19, 1925 – November 20, 2006) was an American television writer and producer. He was the co-creator, with Allan Burns, of the television shows The Munsters (1964) and My Mother the Car (1965), and the creator of Dudley Do-Right.

Biography
Born in Bayonne, New Jersey, Hayward was a writer for the 1957-1958 color edition of Crusader Rabbit (as "Chris Bob Hayward"), The Rocky and Bullwinkle Show, Alice, Barney Miller, Get Smart, 77 Sunset Strip, Fractured Flickers, and The Governor & J.J.

He won, with Allan Burns, the 1968 Emmy Award for "Outstanding Writing Achievement in Comedy" for the episode "The Coming Out Party" of the television show He & She.

Hayward died of cancer on November 20, 2006, in his Beverly Hills home.

References

External links
 
 

1925 births
2006 deaths
Writers from Bayonne, New Jersey
American television writers
American male television writers
Primetime Emmy Award winners
Deaths from cancer in California
Screenwriters from New Jersey
20th-century American screenwriters
20th-century American male writers
Television producers from New Jersey